

The Knoller C.I was a reconnaissance aircraft built in Austria-Hungary during World War I for use by the Austro-Hungarian army. It was a conventional biplane design with staggered wings, and seated the pilot and observer in tandem in an open cockpit. The upper wing was swept back.

Production was undertaken at Phönix, but it was built only in small numbers before being supplanted by the Knoller C.II and not all of the examples built were actually flown, with most being placed in storage without engines.

Variants
C.I(Ph) series 25 Production by Phönix Flugzeug-Werke AG, 72 ordered, but only 16 completed.

Operators

Austro-Hungarian Imperial and Royal Aviation Troops

Specifications (C.I(Ph))

References

Further reading
 

1910s Austro-Hungarian military reconnaissance aircraft
Knoller aircraft
Biplanes
Single-engined tractor aircraft
Aircraft first flown in 1916